John Walker was a Scottish professional footballer who played as a centre-half.

References

Scottish footballers
Association football defenders
Vale of Leven F.C. players
Grimsby Town F.C. players
Gainsborough Trinity F.C. players
Everton F.C. players
English Football League players
Year of birth missing